CKY3 may refer to:

 CKY3, the third of the CKY videos, a series of videos by Bam Margera
 Norway House Water Aerodrome, the ICAO airport code for the airport in Canada